Elizabeth Greenleaf may refer to:

 Elizabeth Bristol Greenleaf (1895–1980), American collector of folk songs
 Elizabeth Gooking Greenleaf (1681–1762), American apothecary